Manhattan Beach is an unincorporated community in Tillamook County, Oregon, United States. It lies about a mile north of Rockaway Beach along U.S. Route 101. Manhattan Beach State Recreation Site is nearby.

The Pacific Railway and Navigation Company had a station here named Manhattan Beach when the line opened in 1912. The community's post office operated from 1914 to 1975.

References

Unincorporated communities in Tillamook County, Oregon
1914 establishments in Oregon
Unincorporated communities in Oregon